Narayanpet district is a district in the Indian state of Telangana. Narayanpet is the district headquarters. The district shares boundaries with Mahbubnagar, Vikarabad, Wanaparthy and Jogulamba Gadwal districts and with the Karnataka state.

History 
Historically "Narayanapeta" has been in the Palamoor region by the 6th Century B.C Later Nandas, Mouryas, Sathavahanas, Ikshwakas, Vishnukundinas, Badami Chalukyas, Kanduri Chodas, Kakatiyas, Yadavas of Devagiri, Cheruku kings, Vavilala kings, Munusuri Dyanasty, Bahamani Sultans, Vijayanagara Kings, Recharla Padmanayakas, Kutubshahis, Mughals and Nizam of Hyderabad ruled this area as the part of their Kingdom, this region was known as the land of the Cholas
Mahbub Ali Khan Asaf Jah VI, the Nizam of Hyderabad (1869-1911 AD) was changed the name of "Narayanapeta" to NARAYANPET on 4 December 1890. Narayanapeta was the headquarters of the district since 1883 AD.

the Golconda diamonds also including the famous Kohinoor Diamond come from the Narayanapet district area

Administrative divisions 
The district has 1 revenue division of Narayanapet and is sub-divided into 11 mandals

Mandals

Demographics 
At the time of the 2011 census of India, Narayanpet district had a population of 5,66,874, of whom 282231 were men and 284643 women. The sex ration was 1009. 89% of the population lived in rural areas. The literacy rate was 49.93%. Scheduled Castes and Scheduled Tribes made up 16.2% and 5.1% of the population respectively.

References

External links 
 Official website

 
Districts of Telangana